Lovisa Mathilda Roos (pen name, M. Rs.; 2 August 1852 – 17 July 1908) was a Swedish writer.

Biography
Lovisa Mathilda Roos was born 2 August 1852, in Stockholm. Her parents were Malte Leopold Roos (1806–1882), a colonel at Svea Artillery Regiment, and Mathilda (Tilda) Beata Meurk (born 1821). She was educated at home and at Åhlinska skolan. Remaining unmarried, she lived with his sister Anna and sometimes also with Laura Fitinghoff, with whom she built the Furuliden house in Stocksund, which later became, as she had hoped, a rest home for women.

Roos was a member of the women's association Nya Idun and one of its first committee members.

Roos' novels usually dealt with women's issues and misconduct in society. A religious crisis in the 1880s affected her later books. In the novel  (White Heather), she takes up the unclear living conditions of a teacher and rape. This is considered to have contributed to a government decision that greatly improved teachers' salaries. In women's political pamphlets, she addressed Ellen Key's ideas,  (A word to Miss Ellen Key and to the Swedish woman), 1896. Roos died 17 July 1908, in Danderyd.

Selected works
Fiction

 , 1881.  
 , 1883.  
 , 1884.  
 , 1886.  
 , 1887.  
 , 1888.  
 , 1889.  
 , 1890.  
 , 1891.  
 , 1891.  
 , 1892.  
 , 1896.  
 , 1896.  
 , 1896.  
 , 1897.  
 , 1898.  
 , 1898.  
 , 1903-1904.  
 , 1906.  
 , 1907.  
 , 1907.  
 , 1908.  
 , 1909.  

For children and young readers

 , 1891. Illustrated by Jenny Nyström.   
 , 1892.  
 , 1893.  
 , 1893.  
 , 1893.  
 , 1894. Illustrated by Jenny Nyström.  
 , 1894.  
 , 1894.  
 , 1895.  
 , 1898.  
 , 1898.  
 , 1898.  
 , 1901.  
 , 1905. Illustrated by Jenny Nyström.

References

Bibliography
 Heggestad, Eva (1991).  Uppsala: Avd. för litteratursociologi vid Litteraturvetenskapliga institutionen, Univ.   
 Förbjuden, olycklig kärlek 
 Mathilda Roose, Svenskt författarlexikon: biobibliografisk handbok till Sveriges moderna litteratur. [1, 1900-1940]. Stockholm: Rabén & Sjögren. 1942. pp. 677-678.

Further reading
 Borgström, Eva (2005). "". Tidskrift för litteraturvetenskap (1988) 2005(34):3,: pp. 67–88. 1104–0556. 1104-0556. 
 Borgström, Eva (2006).  / (2006): pp. 5–14. 
 Levin, Hjördis: Mathilda Roos in Svenskt biografiskt lexikon (1998–2000)
 Nordlinder, Eva (1993). "". Läsebok/Carina Lidström (ed.); editing committee: Boel Westin ... (Stockholm : B. Östlings bokförl. Symposion, 1993): pp. 187–198, 305. 
 Samuelsson, Jenny (1996). . Göteborg: Univ., Litteraturvetenskapliga inst. 
 Sarri, Margareta (1982). . Stockholms universitet. Litteraturvetenskapliga inst. 
 Storckenfeldt, Sigrid (1908). . Stockholm.

Further reading

External links

 Mathilda Roos at Swedish Literature Bank 

1852 births
1908 deaths
19th-century Swedish women writers
Writers from Stockholm
19th-century Swedish novelists
Swedish women novelists
Swedish children's writers
Swedish women children's writers
Members of Nya Idun